Anoplophora zonator is a species of beetle in the family Cerambycidae. It is distributed in Borneo, Malaysia, Thailand, Laos, and Myanmar.

References

External links 
 

Lamiini
Beetles described in 1878
Beetles of Asia